Corsicana is a city in Navarro County, Texas, United States. It is located on Interstate 45, 56 miles northeast of Waco, Texas. Its population was 25,109 at the 2020 census. It is the county seat of Navarro County, and an important agribusiness center.

History

Founded in 1848, Corsicana was named by José Antonio Navarro after the Mediterranean island of Corsica, the birthplace of his father. He had died when Navarro and his many siblings were young.  The first school opened shortly afterwards in 1849.

Women's groups have had a strong role throughout the history of the city. They established the Corsicana Female Literary Institute, a school that operated from 1857 through 1870. The first public library in Corsicana opened in 1901 by effort of the women's clubs of the city. A 1905 library matching gift by Andrew Carnegie gave the library a permanent home and its first full-time, professionally trained librarian. The library today is housed in a dedicated building downtown and boasts more than 52,283 books, 6,306 audio materials, 783 video materials, and 122 serial subscriptions.

The Corsicana Jewish community dates from 1871; they established the 1898 Moorish Revival architectural styled Temple Beth-El, Corsicana. Few Jewish residents live here today, and the congregation sold the temple. The Historical Society has adapted the temple for use as a community center.

The Corsicana YMCA was founded in 1884, and has grown with patron funding. In its earliest days, it was supported by George Taylor Jester (1847–1922), a wealthy dry-goods and cotton distributor, banker, and politician. He served as lieutenant governor of Texas (1895–1899), and his son Beauford H. Jester served as governor (1947–1949).

Oil was accidentally discovered in June, 1894, by the American Well and Prospecting Company, hired by the Corsicana Water Development Company, when oil seeped into an artesian well being drilled within the city limits.  In October 1895, the first commercial oil well was drilled by the Corsicana Oil Development Company, founded by Ralph Beaton, H.G. Damon, and John Davidson. It was the first commercially significant oilfield find in Texas. A refinery was in operation by January 1899, through the efforts of Joseph S. Cullinan.  The Powell oil field was discovered in 1900, a few miles east of Corsicana. Rotary drilling, used to drill water wells, was introduced to the oil industry by M.C. Baker and C.E. Baker, with tools manufactured by the American Well and Prospecting machine shop, owned by N.G. Johnson, E.H. Akin, and Charles Rittersbacker.

During World War II, an airman flying school called Corsicana Air Field trained thousands of pilots.

Geography

Corsicana is located at  (32.092480, –96.469407).

Richland Chambers Reservoir is the third-largest lake by surface area and the eighth-largest reservoir by water volume in Texas.

Climate

Corsicana has a moderate humid subtropical climate.  The range of low-high average temperatures in January, April, July, and October is 34/55,  53/75, 73/95, and 55/79 °F, respectively.

Leafy oak, pecan, magnolia, and walnut trees are common, and grasses grow tall and green. Rain is fairly evenly distributed throughout the year, with small, wetter peaks in May and October.

Demographics

2020 census

As of the 2020 United States census,  25,109 people, 8,051 households, and 5,643 families were residing in the city.

2010 census
As of the census of 2010,  23,770 people, 8,490 households, and 5,966 families were residing in the city. The population density was 1,048.3 people per square mile (404.8/km). The 9,491 housing units averaged 460.5 per square mile (177.8/km). The racial makeup of the city was 58.1% White, 20.9% African American, 0.6% Native American, 0.7% Asian, 1.3% Pacific Islander, 16% from other races, and 2.4% from two or more races. Hispanics or Latinos of any race were 31.1% of the population.

Of the 8,490 households, 28.8% had children under 18 living with them in 2010, 48.6% were married couples living together, 15.0% had a female householder with no husband present, and 31.9% were not families. About 27.3% of all households were made up of individuals, and 13.7% had someone living alone who was 65 or older. The average household size was 2.64, and the average family size was 3.21.

In the city, the population was distributed as 27.3% under 18, 12.6% from 18 to 24, 26.6% from 25 to 44, 18.6% from 45 to 64, and 15.0% who were 65 or older. The median age was 32 years. For every 100 females, there were 94.2 males. For every 100 females age 18 and over, there were 89.9 males.

The median income for a household in the city was $27,203, and for a family was $33,078. Males had a median income of $27,516 versus $19,844 for females. The per capita income for the city was $14,001. About 17.4% of families and 22.3% of the population were below the poverty line, including 29.4% of those under age 18 and 15.1% of those age 65 or over.

The housing stock in 2007 consisted of 12,313 houses and condominiums.  About two-thirds were owner-occupied, and one-third rented.  The median price asked for vacant for-sale houses and condos in 2007 was $87,955.  The median amount of real estate property taxes paid for housing units in 2007 was $912.

Arts and entertainment

Today's downtown supports an active performing-arts community, with year-round live theater, art exhibits, and music performances in a corner of downtown anchored by the Warehouse Living Arts Center and the Palace Theater. Also, an art contest was started in 2018.
Downtown also features the historic State National Bank building (built in 1926), several coffeeshops and eateries, an art gallery,  several bric-à-brac outlets, and many brick-faced storefronts of historical interest.

A green park a short walk from the county courthouse downtown has meandering creeks and walking, jogging, and biking trails. Other amenities include lighted tennis courts, a children's play area with a retired fire truck, spray park, and designated skate area.  At one end of the community park is the town YMCA, with a year-round indoor pool, basketball courts, cardio- and free-weight equipment, and instructor-led fitness workshops.

The town has several museums: Pioneer Village, located by Jester Park, offers reconstructed buildings and artifacts from the early historical period of the area. A museum is dedicated to Lefty Frizzell, a Nashville singer born in town during the late 1920s.

The Cook Education Center, located on the Navarro College campus, is a multifaceted venue offering event space, gift shop, a planetarium, Civil War museum, and Western Art gallery. The planetarium is among the largest in Texas, featuring a  dome and 200 seats. The planetarium offers narrated astronomical shows and 70 mm film for nominal admission.

The center is also home to the Pearce Collections Museum, which boasts a collection of Civil War memorabilia and a Western Art gallery featuring a number of renowned Western artists.  The Cook Education Center hosts the annual Navarro College Foundation fundraiser Elegance, which benefits scholarship programs for Navarro College students. The Navarro College Performing Arts Department stages several musical recitals and two staged plays a year at the Dawson Auditorium on the west side of town.

Cinergy Cinemas and Entertainment opened a complex in 2011 near the intersection of highways 287 and 45 containing eight theaters, mini bowling, a go-kart track, and an arcade/game room. In 2015, the location was sold to Schulman Theaters and is now branded as Schulman's Movie Bowl Grille-Corsicana.

The Navarro County Exposition Center on West State Highway 22 hosts many horse shows year-round.

Government and infrastructure
The Texas Youth Commission and later the Texas Department of Juvenile Justice formerly operated the Corsicana Residential Treatment Center in the city.

Economy
Oil City Iron Works, Inc., today a ductile and gray iron foundry, was started in 1866 to make parts for the owner's cotton gin. Wolf Brand Chili, a national brand named for the owner's pet wolf, Kaiser Bill, started in 1895 as a downtown by-the-bowl lunch wagon. Wolf Brand Chili was made in Corsicana until 1986. Corsicana is best known as the home of the Collin Street Bakery, which has been making fruitcakes since 1896.

Today's economy no longer relies on oil and gas. Major employers include Russell Stover Candies and Collin Street Bakery, Guardian Industries (glass), Corsicana Bedding, and Kohl's distribution centers, Navarro Regional hospital (160+ beds), Trinity/Mother Francis Health System, and the Texas State Home.  There are several 24/7 pharmacies, grocery stores and chain department stores scattered about the town. College Park Mall is an enclosed shopping mall that primarily houses a Beall's clothing store. Additionally, a  Wal-Mart Supercenter is located on the southwestern edge of the town.

Corsicana was the home of Tradewest, a coin-arcade and video game company founded in 1986. Tradewest was known for such Nintendo Entertainment System classics as "Double Dragon" and "Battletoads". Tradewest later became Williams Entertainment (known for the Mortal Kombat series) in 1994, then Midway Home Entertainment after an acquisition from WMS Industries. The Corsicana offices were closed by Midway in late 2002.

Schools

Corsicana is home to Navarro College, which offers associate degrees and is also a satellite facility of Texas A&M University-Commerce, through which students can receive bachelor's and graduate degrees. Navarro College came to international prominence in 2020 owing to its dominant coed cheerleading team, which was featured that year in a Netflix docuseries centering on the team's preparation for the National Cheerleaders Association national championships in Daytona Beach, Florida. The cheerleading squad is currently coached by Monica Aldama, who, since 2000, has led the Bulldogs to 14 championships in their division, as well as five "Grand National" designations (for the highest overall score in competition that year).

The Corsicana Independent School District (CISD) has an enrollment over 6,500 students. Five CISD schools have been lauded by the Texas Education Agency (TEA): Bowie, Fannin, Carroll, and Navarro Elementary Schools and Drane Intermediate School all achieved "recognized" status.

Collins Middle School and Corsicana High School were rated "academically acceptable" by the TEA. The CISD received Academically Acceptable status from the state.

Corsicana also has one private school, James L. Collins Catholic School, for kindergarten through eighth grade. Founded in 1953 by a bequest from its namesake benefactor, the school today has an enrollment of 270 students.

Notable people

References

External links

 City of Corsicana
 Corsicana/Navarro Chamber of Commerce
 Corsicana YMCA
 Texas Outside: Richland Chambers Reservoir
 
 
 
 
 

 
Cities in Texas
Cities in Navarro County, Texas
Corsican diaspora
County seats in Texas
Micropolitan areas of Texas
Populated places established in 1848
1848 establishments in Texas